Romelu Lukaku is a Belgian professional footballer who represents the Belgium national football team as a striker. He made his debut for his country in a 1–0 defeat to Croatia in Brussels in March 2010. His first and second international goals came on his eighth appearance for Belgium, in a 2–0 friendly victory over Russia. , Lukaku is his country's top scorer with 68 goals in 104 appearances, ahead of Bernard Voorhoof and Paul Van Himst (30 goals). The Belgian Football Association confirmed that he had broken the national record when Lukaku scored his 31st international goal in a match against Japan in November 2017. FIFA, however, did not initially recognise the record as three goals had been scored against Luxembourg in a friendly in May 2014 later declared by the organisation as an unofficial friendly due to too many substitutions being made. He scored twice against Tunisia in the group stages of the 2018 FIFA World Cup, a game after which football journalist Nick Ames praised him for a "laudable act of sportsmanship" as he had indicated to the referee that he had not been fouled in the penalty area, denying himself the chance of a hat-trick. The two goals took his overall tally in the 2018 World Cup to four and made him Belgium's highest scorer in a single World Cup tournament, and made him the first player since Diego Maradona in the 1986 FIFA World Cup to score back-to-back braces (two goals in a single game).

As of December 2022, Lukaku has scored two hat-tricks during his international career, including the treble against Luxembourg, with the other coming in a 9–0 win against Gibraltar in a 2018 World Cup qualifier in August 2017. Lukaku has scored more goals in friendlies than in any other format, with 22. He has scored eighteen goals in qualifying for the FIFA World Cup, five in FIFA World Cup finals, seven in qualifying for the UEFA European Championship, six in the European Championship finals and ten in the UEFA Nations League. Lukaku scored his most recent goal in a 2–3 UEFA Nations League Finals loss against France in October 2021.

International goals

Scores and results list Belgium's goal tally first, score column indicates score after each Lukaku goal.

Hat-tricks

Statistics

See also
 List of top international men's football goalscorers by country
 List of men's footballers with 50 or more international goals

References

Lukaku, Romelu
Belgium national football team records and statistics